Clearwater Lake is one of six large lakes in Wells Gray Provincial Park in east-central British Columbia, Canada,. The Clearwater River enters the lake at its north end, flowing from Hobson Lake and Azure Lake, and also drains the lake. There are several small streams that flow into Clearwater Lake, but it has no significant tributaries.

Formation

The basin occupied by Clearwater Lake was scoured by glaciers during several ice ages, including the Wisconsin Ice Age which ended in this region about 10,000 years ago. The basin subsequently filled with meltwater, but its depth has never been measured reliably. The deepest point is believed to be just east of Diver's Bluff. This flow is just one example of volcanic activity that has occurred in the Wells Gray-Clearwater volcanic field during the last 500,000 years.

Osprey Falls occurs where the Clearwater River empties out of Clearwater Lake. Osprey Falls is very hazardous to boaters on Clearwater Lake because of the strong current in the southern . Up to 2003, 18 people had been swept over Osprey Falls and only three survived.

Access and trails
The Clearwater Valley Road (also called Wells Gray Park Road) ends at Clearwater Lake. Wells Gray Park's largest campgrounds, Clearwater Lake and Falls Creek, are adjacent to Osprey Falls and have 80 sites total. Lake tours and a water taxi service operate from near the campgrounds. The public boat launching ramp is  further up the lake.

A trail follows the lakeshore from the water taxi dock to the public boat launch.

At the north end of Clearwater Lake, a portage trail provides access for canoeists and kayakers to nearby Azure Lake.

Some older maps show a trail to Azure and Zodiac Mountains from the east shore of Clearwater Lake, but this trail is no longer passable.

Seven campgrounds with a few sites at each are located along the east and west shores of Clearwater Lake. The only access is by boat.

Naming
The Overlanders expedition to the Cariboo goldfields rafted down the North Thompson River in 1862. When they arrived at the mouth of the Clearwater River, they noted its distinct clarity compared to the muddy North Thompson and named it Clear Water. The lake was probably seen by white prospectors in 1866 and the river's name was extended to the lake.

References

External links
Wells Gray Provincial Park official government website

Lakes of British Columbia
Wells Gray-Clearwater
Lava dammed lakes
Kamloops Division Yale Land District